Dakshin Kamrup College is an educational institution for higher education affiliated to Gauhati University and the college is located at Mirza in Kamrup District of Assam. At present the college has the Arts, Commerce  and Science streams with seventeen  departments offering Major courses.

History
The Dakshin Kamrup College was established in 1961 at Mirza. In the year 1972 the college shifted from its old premises to the present location. In 2005, The College was provincialised by the Govt. of Assam.

Dakshin Kamrup College is a co- educational   degree college affiliated to Gauhati University. At present the yearly enrollment of the college is 5741 Nos. approximately. The College offered only the art education till 1978. The science stream started in 1979. The college has successfully completed its glorious 50 years in 2011.

Location
The college is situated at Mirza which is 6 km to the west from Lokapriya Gopinath Bordoloi International Airport, Guwahati.

Academics

 Two-year Higher Secondary Course in Arts and Science under Assam Higher Secondary Education Council.
 Three-year Degree Course in Arts, Science and commerce under Gauhati University (Semester Pattern).
 Post Graduate Diploma in Computer Application.
 M.A. in Assamese.
M.Sc in Zoology 
 BMC (Bachelor of Mass Communication)
 B. VOC (Bachelor of Vocation)

Departments

References

External links
 

Universities and colleges in Assam
Gauhati University
Colleges affiliated to Gauhati University
1961 establishments in Assam
Educational institutions established in 1961